Fernando de Argila Pazzaglia (26 December 1920 – 8 January 2015), known as Argila, was a Spanish footballer who played as a goalkeeper. Having begun his career with Barcelona in 1940, he moved to Oviedo in 1944 where he made 247 league appearances until 1957. He spent part of the 1951–52 season on loan at Atlético Madrid. He played in one match for the Spain national team in 1954. He was also named in Spain's squad for the Group 6 qualification tournament for the 1954 FIFA World Cup.

References

External links
 

1920 births
2015 deaths
Spanish footballers
Footballers from Barcelona
Association football goalkeepers
Spain international footballers
La Liga players
Segunda División players
FC Barcelona players
Real Oviedo players
Atlético Madrid footballers